Collops quadrimaculatus, the four-spotted collops, is a species of soft-winged flower beetle in the family Melyridae. It is found in Central and North America.

References

External links

 

Melyridae
Beetles described in 1798